The Pied Piper of Hamelin (also known as the Pan Piper or the Rat-Catcher of Hamelin) is the title character of a legend from the town of Hamelin (Hameln), Lower Saxony, Germany.

The legend dates back to the Middle Ages, the earliest references describing a piper, dressed in multicolored ("pied") clothing, who was a rat catcher hired by the town to lure rats away with his magic pipe. When the citizens refuse to pay for this service as promised, he retaliates by using his instrument's magical power on their children, leading them away as he had the rats. This version of the story spread as folklore and has appeared in the writings of Johann Wolfgang von Goethe, the Brothers Grimm, and Robert Browning, among others. The phrase "pied piper" has become a metaphor for a person who attracts a following through charisma or false promises.

There are many contradictory theories about the Pied Piper. Some suggest he was a symbol of hope to the people of Hamelin, which had been attacked by plague; he drove the rats from Hamelin, saving the people from the epidemic.

The earliest known record of the story originates from the town of Hamelin itself, depicted in a stained glass window created for the church of Hamelin, which dated to around 1300. Although the church was destroyed in 1660, several written accounts of the tale have survived.

Plot
In 1284, while the town of Hamelin was suffering from a rat infestation, a piper dressed in multicolored ("pied") clothing appeared, claiming to be a rat-catcher. He promised the mayor a solution to their problem with the rats. The mayor, in turn, promised to pay him for the removal of the rats (the promised sum was 1,000 guilders). The piper accepted and played his pipe to lure the rats into the Weser River, where all the rats drowned.

Despite the piper's success, the mayor reneged on his promise and refused to pay him the full sum (reputedly reduced to a sum of 50 guilders) even going so far as to blame the piper for bringing the rats himself in an extortion attempt. Enraged, the piper stormed out of the town, vowing to return later to take revenge. On Saint John and Paul's day, while the adults were in church, the piper returned, dressed in green like a hunter and playing his pipe. In so doing, he attracted the town's children. One hundred and thirty children followed him out of town and into a cave, after which they were never seen again. Depending on the version, at most three children remained behind: one was lame and could not follow quickly enough, the second was deaf and therefore could not hear the music, and the last was blind and therefore unable to see where he was going. These three informed the villagers of what had happened when they came out from church.

Other versions relate that the Pied Piper led the children to the top of Koppelberg Hill, where he took them to a beautiful land, or a place called Koppenberg Mountain, or Transylvania, or that he made them walk into the Weser as he did with the rats, and they all drowned. Some versions state that the Piper returned the children after extorting payment, or that the children were only returned after the villagers paid several times the original payment in gold.

The Hamelin street named  ("street without drums") is believed to be the last place that the children were seen. Ever since, music or dancing is not allowed on this street.

Background

The earliest mention of the story seems to have been on a stained-glass window placed in the Church of Hamelin . The window was described in several accounts between the 14th and 17th centuries. It was destroyed in 1660. Based on the surviving descriptions, a modern reconstruction of the window has been created by historian Hans Dobbertin. It features the colorful figure of the Pied Piper and several figures of children dressed in white.

The window is generally considered to have been created in memory of a tragic historical event for the town; Hamelin town records also apparently start with this event. The earliest written record is from the town chronicles in an entry from 1384 which reportedly states: "It is 100 years since our children left."

Although research has been conducted for centuries, no explanation for the historical event is universally accepted as true.

14th-century Decan Lude chorus book 
Decan Lude of Hamelin was reported  to have in his possession a chorus book containing a Latin verse giving an eyewitness account of the event.

15th-century Lüneburg manuscript
The Lüneburg manuscript gives an early German account of the event. According to the Christmas Eve edition of ''The Saturday Evening Post'' in 1955, on the back of the last tattered page of a dusty chronicle called The Golden Chain, written in Latin in 1370 by the monk Heinrich of Hereford, is there written in a different handwriting the following account:Here follows a marvellous wonder, which transpired in the town of Hamelin in the diocese of Minden, in the Year of Our Lord, 1284, on the Feast of Saints John and Paul. A certain young man thirty years of age, handsome and well-dressed, so that all who saw him admired him because of his appearance, crossed the bridges and entered the town by the West Gate. He then began to play all through the town a silver pipe of the most magnificent sort. All the children who heard his pipe, in the number of 130, followed him to the East Gate and out of the town to the so-called execution place or Calvary. There they proceeded to vanish, so that no trace of them could be found. The mothers of the children ran from town to town, but they found nothing. It is written: A voice was heard from on high, and a mother was bewailing her son. And as one counts the years according to the Year of Our Lord or according to the first, second or third year of an anniversary, so do the people in Hamelin reckon the years after the departure and disappearance of their children. This report I found in an old book. And the mother of the Dean Johann von Lüde saw the children depart.

Rattenfängerhaus 

According to author Fanny Rostek-Lühmann this is the oldest surviving account.  (High German , meaning a knoll or domed hill) seems to be a reference to one of several hills surrounding Hamelin. Which of them was intended by the manuscript's author remains uncertain.

The Wedding House 
A similar inscription can be found on the "Wedding- or Hochzeitshaus, a fine structure erected between 1610 and 1617 for marriage festivities, but diverted from its purpose since 1721. Behind rises the spire of the parish church of St. Nicholas which, in the words of an English book of folklore, may still "enwall stones that witness how the parents prayed, while the Piper wrought sorrow for them without":

The Town Gate 
Part of the town gate from the year 1556 is today exhibited at the Hamelin Museum. According to Hamelin Museum, this stone is the oldest surviving sculptural evidence for the legend. It bears the following inscription:

Verses in the monastery at Hamelin 
The Hamelin Museum writes:In the mid 14th Century, a monk from Minden, Heinrich von Herford, puts together a collection of holy legends called the “Catena Aurea”.  It speaks of a “miracle” that took place in 1284 in Hamelin.  A youth appeared and played on a strange silver flute.  Every child that heard the flute, followed the stranger.  They left Hameln by the Eastern gate and disappeared at Kalvarien Hill.  This is the oldest known account of this occurrence. Around this time a verse of rhyme is found in “zu Hameln im Kloster”.  It tells about the children’s disappearance.  It is written in red ink on the title page of a missal.  It bewails “the 130 beloved Hamelner children” who were “eaten alive by Calvaria”.  The original verses are probably the oldest written source of this legend.  It has been missing for hundreds of years.However, different versions of transcriptions of handwritten copies still exist. One was published by Heinrich Meibom in 1688. Another was included by Johann Daniel Gottlieb Herr under the title Passionale Sanctorum in Collectanea zur Geschichte der Stadt Hameln. His manuscript is dated 1761. There are some Latin verses which had a prose version underneath:

16th- and 17th-century sources 
Somewhere between 1559 and 1565, Count Froben Christoph von Zimmern included a version in his . This appears to be the earliest account which mentions the plague of rats. Von Zimmern dates the event only as "several hundred years ago", so that his version throws no light on the conflict of dates (see next paragraph). Another contemporary account is that of Johann Weyer in his  (1563).

Theories

Natural causes 

A number of theories suggest that children died of some natural causes such as disease or starvation, and that the Piper was a symbolic figure of Death. Some of the scenarios that have been suggested as fitting this theory include that the children drowned in the river Weser, were killed in a landslide or contracted some disease during an epidemic. Another modern interpretation reads the story as alluding to an event where Hamelin children were lured away by a pagan or heretic sect to forests near Coppenbrügge (the mysterious  "hills" of the poem) for ritual dancing where they all perished during a sudden landslide or collapsing sinkhole.

Emigration 
Speculation on the emigration theory is based on the idea that, by the 13th century, overpopulation of the area resulted in the oldest son owning all the land and power (majorat), leaving the rest as serfs. It has also been suggested that one reason the emigration of the children was never documented was that the children were sold to a recruiter from the Baltic region of Eastern Europe, a practice that was not uncommon at the time.  In his book The Pied Piper: A Handbook, Wolfgang Mieder states that historical documents exist showing that people from the area including Hamelin did help settle parts of Transylvania. Emily Gerard reports in The Land Beyond the Forest an element of the folktale that "popular tradition has averred the Germans who about that time made their appearance in Transylvania to be no other than the lost children of Hameln, who, having performed their long journey by subterranean passages, reissued to the light of day through the opening of a cavern known as the Almescher Höhle, in the north-east of Transylvania." Transylvania had suffered under lengthy Mongol invasions of Central Europe, led by two grandsons of Genghis Khan and which date from around the time of the earliest appearance of the legend of the piper, the early 13th century.

In the version of the legend posted on the official website for the town of Hamelin, another aspect of the emigration theory is presented:

Among the various interpretations, reference to the colonization of East Europe starting from Low Germany is the most plausible one: The "Children of Hameln" would have been in those days citizens willing to emigrate being recruited by landowners to settle in Moravia, East Prussia, Pomerania or in the Teutonic Land. It is assumed that in past times all people of a town were referred to as "children of the town" or "town children" as is frequently done today. The "Legend of the children's Exodus" was later connected to the "Legend of expelling the rats". This most certainly refers to the rat plagues being a great threat in the medieval milling town and the more or less successful professional rat catchers.

The theory is provided credence by the fact that family names common to Hamelin at the time "show up with surprising frequency in the areas of Uckermark and Prignitz, near Berlin."

Historian Ursula Sautter, citing the work of linguist Jürgen Udolph, offers this hypothesis in support of the emigration theory:

"After the defeat of the Danes at the Battle of Bornhöved in 1227," explains Udolph, "the region south of the Baltic Sea, which was then inhabited by Slavs, became available for colonization by the Germans." The bishops and dukes of Pomerania, Brandenburg, Uckermark and Prignitz sent out glib "locators," medieval recruitment officers, offering rich rewards to those who were willing to move to the new lands. Thousands of young adults from Lower Saxony and Westphalia headed east. And as evidence, about a dozen Westphalian place names show up in this area. Indeed there are five villages called Hindenburg running in a straight line from Westphalia to Pomerania, as well as three eastern Spiegelbergs and a trail of etymology from Beverungen south of Hamelin to Beveringen northwest of Berlin to Beweringen in modern Poland.

Udolph favors the hypothesis that the Hamelin youths wound up in what is now Poland. Genealogist Dick Eastman cited Udolph's research on Hamelin surnames that have shown up in Polish phonebooks:

Linguistics professor Jürgen Udolph says that 130 children did vanish on a June day in the year 1284 from the German village of Hamelin ( in German). Udolph entered all the known family names in the village at that time and then started searching for matches elsewhere. He found that the same surnames occur with amazing frequency in the regions of Prignitz and Uckermark, both north of Berlin. He also found the same surnames in the former Pomeranian region, which is now a part of Poland.

Udolph surmises that the children were actually unemployed youths who had been sucked into the German drive to colonize its new settlements in Eastern Europe. The Pied Piper may never have existed as such, but, says the professor, "There were characters known as lokators who roamed northern Germany trying to recruit settlers for the East." Some of them were brightly dressed, and all were silver-tongued.

Professor Udolph can show that the Hamelin exodus should be linked with the Battle of Bornhöved in 1227 which broke the Danish hold on Eastern Europe. That opened the way for German colonization, and by the latter part of the thirteenth century there were systematic attempts to bring able-bodied youths to Brandenburg and Pomerania. The settlement, according to the professor's name search, ended up near Starogard in what is now northwestern Poland. A village near Hamelin, for example, is called Beverungen and has an almost exact counterpart called Beveringen, near Pritzwalk, north of Berlin and another called Beweringen, near Starogard.

Local Polish telephone books list names that are not the typical Slavic names one would expect in that region. Instead, many of the names seem to be derived from German names that were common in the village of Hamelin in the thirteenth century. In fact, the names in today's Polish telephone directories include Hamel, Hamler and Hamelnikow, all apparently derived from the name of the original village.

Pagan—Christian conflict 
It has been noted that all local reports of the incident date it to the specific date of 26 June, the date of pagan midsummer celebrations and often also place emphasis the children being led away to the "Koppen" meaning hills. It was traditional in some areas of Germany to celebrate midsummer by lighting bonfires in the hills. This has led to speculation that the children may have been led away by a pagan shaman to participate in one of these celebrations and been forced into a monastery or massacred by local Christians.

Other 
Some theories have linked the disappearance of the children to mass psychogenic illness in the form of dancing mania. Dancing mania outbreaks occurred during the 13th century, including one in 1237 in which a large group of children travelled from Erfurt to Arnstadt (about ), jumping and dancing all the way, in marked similarity to the legend of the Pied Piper of Hamelin, which originated at around the same time.

Others have suggested that the children left Hamelin to be part of a pilgrimage, a military campaign, or even a new Children's Crusade (which is said to have occurred in 1212) but never returned to their parents. These theories see the unnamed Piper as their leader or a recruiting agent. The townspeople made up this story (instead of recording the facts) to avoid the wrath of the church or the king.

William Manchester's A World Lit Only by Fire places the events in 1484, 100 years after the written mention in the town chronicles that "It is 100 years since our children left", and further proposes that the Pied Piper was a psychopathic paedophile.

Adaptations

 In 1803, Johann Wolfgang von Goethe wrote a poem based on the story that was later set to music by Hugo Wolf. Goethe also incorporated references to the story in his version of Faust. (The first part of the drama was first published in 1808 and the second in 1832.)
 Jakob and Wilhelm Grimm, known as the Brothers Grimm, drawing from 11 sources, included the tale in their collection Deutsche Sagen (first published in 1816). According to their account, two children were left behind, as one was blind and the other lame, so neither could follow the others. The rest became the founders of Siebenbürgen (Transylvania).
 Robert Browning wrote a poem called "The Pied Piper of Hamelin", using the 1605 Verstegan version of the tale (the earliest account in English) and adopting the 1376 date. The poem was published in Browning's Dramatic Lyrics (1842). His retelling in verse is notable for its humour, wordplay, and jingling rhymes.
 Viktor Dyk's Krysař (The Rat-Catcher), published in 1915, retells the story in a slightly darker, more enigmatic way. The short novel also features the character of Faust.
 In Marina Tsvetaeva's long poem liricheskaia satira, The Rat-Catcher (serialized in the émigré journal Volia Rossii in 1925–1926), rats are an allegory of people influenced by Bolshevik propaganda.
 The Pied Piper (16 September 1933) is a short animated film based on the story, produced by Walt Disney Productions, directed by Wilfred Jackson, and released as a part of Walt Disney's Silly Symphonies series. It stars the voice talents of Billy Bletcher as the Mayor of Hamelin.
ಬೊಮ್ಮನಹಳ್ಳಿಯ ಕಿಂದರ ಜೋಗಿ (Kondara Jogi of Bommanahalli) by the Kannada poet-laureate Kuvempu is a poetic adaptation of the story
Paying the Piper, starring Porky Pig, is a  Looney Tunes parody of the tale of the Pied Piper.
The Town on the Edge of the End, a comic-book version, was published by Walt Kelly in his 1954 Pogo collection Pogo Stepmother Goose.
Van Johnson starred as the Piper in NBC studios' adaptation: The Pied Piper of Hamelin (1957).
 The Pied Piper is a 1972 British film directed by Jacques Demy and starring Jack Wild, Donald Pleasence, and John Hurt and featuring Donovan and Diana Dors.
 "Emissary from Hamelin" is a short story written by Harlan Ellison, published in 1978 in the collection Strange Wine.
 The Pied Piper of Hamelin is a 1981 stop-motion animated film by Cosgrove Hall using Robert Browning's original poem verbatim. This adaptation was later shown as an episode for the PBS series Long Ago and Far Away.
 The paperback horror novel Come, Follow Me by Philip Michaels (Avon Books, 1983) is based on the story.
 In 1985 Robert Browning's poetic retelling of the story was adapted as an episode of Shelley Duvall's Faerie Tale Theatre starring Eric Idle as the Piper, and as Robert Browning in the prologue and epilogue, who narrates the poem to a young boy.
 In 1986, Jiří Bárta made an animated movie The Pied Piper based more on the above-mentioned story by Viktor Dyk; the movie was accompanied by the rock music by Michal Pavlíček.
 In 1989, W11 Opera premiered Koppelberg, an opera they commissioned from composer Steve Gray and lyricist Norman Brooke; the work was based on the Robert Browning poem. 
 In Atom Egoyan's The Sweet Hereafter (1997), the myth of the Pied Piper is a metaphor for a town’s failure to protect its children. 
 China Miéville's 1998 London-set novel King Rat centers on the ancient rivalry between the rats (some of whom are portrayed as having humanlike characteristics) and the Pied Piper, who appears in the novel as a mysterious musician named Pete who infiltrates the local club-music scene.
 The cast of Peanuts did their own version of the tale in the direct-to-DVD special It's the Pied Piper, Charlie Brown (2000), which was the final special to have the involvement of original creator Charles Schulz, who died before it was released.
 Demons and Wizards' first album, Demons and Wizards (2000), includes a track called "The Whistler" which recounts the tale of the Pied Piper.
 Terry Pratchett's 2001 young-adult novel, The Amazing Maurice and His Educated Rodents, parodies the legend from the perspective of the rats, the piper, and their handler.
 The 2003 television film The Electric Piper, set in the United States in the 1960s, depicts the piper as a psychedelic rock guitarist modeled after Jimi Hendrix.
 The Pied Piper of Hamelin was adapted in Happily Ever After: Fairy Tales for Every Child where it uses jazz music. The episode featured Wesley Snipes as the Pied Piper and the music performed by Ronnie Laws as well as the voices of Samuel L. Jackson as the Mayor of Hamelin, Grant Shaud as the Mayor's assistant Toadey, John Ratzenberger and Richard Moll as respective guards Hinky and Dinky.
 The Pied Piper, "voiced" by Jeremy Steig, has a small role (flute only) in the 2010 Dreamworks animated film Shrek Forever After.
 In the anime adaptation of the Japanese light novel series, Problem Children Are Coming from Another World, Aren't They? (2013), a major story revolves around the "false legend" of Pied Piper of Hamelin. The adaptation speaks in great length about the original source and the various versions of the story that sprang up throughout the years. It is stated that Weser, the representation of Natural Disaster, was the true Piper of Hamelin (meaning the children were killed by drowning or landslides).
 In Ever After High, the Pied Piper has a daughter named Melody.
 In 2015, a South Korean horror movie title The Piper was released. It is a loose adaptation of the Brothers Grimm tale where the Pied Piper uses the rats for his revenge to kill all the villagers except for the children whom he traps in a cave.
 The short story "The Rat King" by John Connolly, first included in the 2016 edition of his novel The Book of Lost Things, is a fairly faithful adaptation of the legend, but with a new ending. It was adapted for BBC Radio 4 and first broadcast on 28 October 2016.
In 2016, Victorian Opera presented The Pied Piper, an Opera by Richard Mills. At the Playhouse the Art Centre, Melbourne, Victoria, Australia.
 In the American TV series Once Upon a Time, the Pied Piper is revealed to be Peter Pan, who is using pipes to call out to "lost boys" and take them away from their homes.
In the Netflix series The Society, a man named Pfeiffer removes a mysterious smell from the town of West Ham, but is not paid. Two days later he takes the kids on field trip in a school bus and returns them to an alternate version of the town where the adults are not present.
In the song "Pied Piper" by the boy group BTS, dedicated to their fans to remind them not to get distracted by said group.
In 2019, the collectible card game Magic: The Gathering introduced a new set based on European folk and fairy tales.  This set contained the first direct reference to the Piper, by being named "Piper of the Swarm".
In the 1995 anime film Sailor Moon SuperS: The Movie, one of the film's antagonists named Poupelin was very similar to the Pied Piper, using his special flute to hypnotize children and follow him into his ship away from their homes where they sailed off to his home planet.
In Teenage Mutant Ninja Turtles there is a villain called the Rat King who uses rats as troops; like the Pied Piper he uses a flute to charm them and even turns Master Splinter on his prized students.
The HBO series Silicon Valley centers around a compression company called Pied Piper. The denouement of the series depicts the company as benevolent and self-sacrificing as opposed to the extortionist depiction in the fable.  One of the characters refers to the company's eponymous inspiration as "a predatory flautist who murders children in a cave."
  The Pied Piper, an opera in one act based on the poem The Pied Piper of Hamelin by Robert Browning with additional material by Adam Cornford.  Music by Daniel Steven Crafts
Karl Weigl composed a children’s operetta The Pied Piper of Hamelin in 1934, with libretto by Helene Scheu-Riesz. Under the direction of Davide Casali, the Festival Viktor Ullmann mounted a dramatic performance of the operetta in 2021, in Italian rather than the original German.
Piedmon, from the first season of the animated series Digimon (1999), is also based on the Pied Piper. In the show, he played a pipe and was able to lure other people and Digimon to do his bidding, much like mind control.
 Piper, a 2017 liberal adaptation of the original story into a young adult graphic novel written by Jay Asher and Jessica Freeburg and illustrated by Jeff Stokely, from Penguin imprint Razorbill.
 Ratcatcher, a 2022 song by GWAR, has GWAR's lead singer take credit for being the Piper and stealing the children when their bill went unpaid.

Literature 

 The Pied Piper is a central figure in Rainbow Valley and Rilla of Ingleside by Lucy Maud Montgomery, calling, or in hindsight luring, that generation of boys off to war.
“The Piper is coming nearer,” he said, “he is nearer than he was that evening I saw him before. His long, shadowy cloak is blowing around him. He pipes—he pipes—and we must follow—Jem and Carl and Jerry and I—round and round the world. Listen—listen—can’t you hear his wild music?”

Allusions in linguistics
In linguistics, pied-piping is the common name for the ability of question words and relative pronouns to drag other words along with them when brought to the front, as part of the phenomenon called Wh-movement. For example, in "For whom are the pictures?", the word "for" is pied-piped by "whom" away from its declarative position ("The pictures are for me"), and in "The mayor, pictures of whom adorn his office walls" both words "pictures of" are pied-piped in front of the relative pronoun, which normally starts the relative clause.

Some researchers believe that the tale has inspired the common English phrase "pay the piper", although the phrase is potentially a contraction of the English proverb "he who pays the piper calls the tune" which means, contrary to paying a debt such as the modern expression implies, that the person paying for something is the one who gets to say how it should be done.

Modernity 
The present-day city of Hamelin continues to maintain information about the Pied Piper legend and possible origins of the story on its website.  Interest in the city's connection to the story remains so strong that, in 2009, Hamelin held a tourist festival to mark the 725th anniversary of the disappearance of the town's earlier children. The Rat Catcher's House is popular with visitors, although it bears no connection to the Rat-Catcher version of the legend.  Indeed, the Rattenfängerhaus is instead associated with the story due to the earlier inscription upon its facade mentioning the legend.  The house was built much later, in 1602 and 1603.  It is now a Hamelin City-owned restaurant with a Pied Piper theme throughout. The city also maintains an online shop with rat-themed merchandise as well as offering an officially licensed Hamelin Edition of the popular board game Monopoly which depicts the legendary Piper on the cover.

In addition to the recent milestone festival, each year the city marks 26 June as "Rat Catcher's Day". In the United States, a similar holiday for exterminators based on Rat Catcher's Day is marked on 22 July, but has not caught on.

See also

 Hamelen (TV series)
 List of literary accounts of the Pied Piper
 Pied Piper of Hamelin in popular culture
 Hamline University, whose mascot is the Pied Piper

Footnotes

References

Further reading
 Marco Bergmann: Dunkler Pfeifer – Die bisher ungeschriebene Lebensgeschichte des "Rattenfängers von Hameln", BoD, 2. Auflage 2009, .
 Hans Dobbertin: Quellensammlung zur Hamelner Rattenfängersage. Schwartz, Göttingen 1970.
 Hans Dobbertin: Quellenaussagen zur Rattenfängersage. Niemeyer, Hameln 1996 (erw. Neuaufl.). .
 Stanisław Dubiski: Ile prawdy w tej legendzie? (How much truth is there behind the Pied Piper Legend?). [In:] "Wiedza i Życie", No 6/1999.
 Radu Florescu: In Search of the Pied Piper. Athena Press 2005. .
 Norbert Humburg: Der Rattenfänger von Hameln. Die berühmte Sagengestalt in Geschichte und Literatur, Malerei und Musik, auf der Bühne und im Film. Niemeyer, Hameln 2. Aufl. 1990. .
 Peter Stephan Jungk: Der Rattenfänger von Hameln. Recherchen und Gedanken zu einem sagenhaften Mythos. [In:] "Neue Rundschau", No 105 (1994), vol.2, pp. 67–73.
 Ullrich Junker: Rübezahl – Sage und Wirklichkeit. [In:] „Unser Harz. Zeitschrift für Heimatgeschichte, Brauchtum und Natur". Goslar, December 2000, pp. 225–228.
 Wolfgang Mieder: Der Rattenfänger von Hameln. Die Sage in Literatur, Medien und Karikatur. Praesens, Wien 2002. .
 Aleksander R. Michalak: Denar dla Szczurołapa, Replika 2018. 
 Heinrich Spanuth: Der Rattenfänger von Hameln. Niemeyer Hameln 1951.
 Izabela Taraszczuk: Die Rattenfängersage: zur Deutung und Rezeption der Geschichte. [In:] Robert Buczek, Carsten Gansel, Paweł Zimniak, eds.: Germanistyka 3. Texte in Kontexten. Zielona Góra: Oficyna Wydawnicza Uniwersytetu Zielonogórskiego 2004, pp. 261–273. .
 Jürgen Udolph: Zogen die Hamelner Aussiedler nach Mähren? Die Rattenfängersage aus namenkundlicher Sicht. [In:] Niedersächsisches Jahrbuch für Landesgeschichte 69 (1997), pp. 125–183.

External links

 Maria J. Pérez Cuervo: "The Lost Children of Hamelin". Originally published in Fortean Times. 
 The Lüneburg Manuscript – The original manuscript published digitally
Chronica Ecclesiæ Hamelensis (1384) by Joannem de Polda, Seniorem Ecclesiæ, in Rerum Germanicarum tomi III : I. Historicos Germanicos (1688) by Heinrich Meibom
D. L. Ashliman of the University of Pittsburgh quotes the Grimm's "Children of Hamelin" in full, as well as a number of similar and related legends.
 An 1888 illustrated version of Robert Browning's poem (Illustrated by Kate Greenaway)
 The 725th anniversary of the Pied Piper in 2009
 The Pied Piper of Hamelin From the Collections at the Library of Congress
 A Translation of Grimm's Saga No. 245 "The Children of Hameln"
 A version of the legend from Howel's Famous Letters

 
1284 in Europe
Fiction set in the 1280s
Fictional characters from Lower Saxony
Fictional kidnappers
Fictional flautists
German folklore
Grimms' Fairy Tales
Hamelin
Johann Wolfgang von Goethe
Legendary German people
Music in fiction
Poetry by Robert Browning
Transylvania in fiction